Events from the year 1553 in Sweden

Incumbents
 Monarch – Gustav I

Events

 - The monarch prohibit the export of Osmond process to benefit the Wrought iron in Europe. 
 - Publication of the song book Een liten Songbook.
 - A tax is introduced in Norrland for the repair of Sala Silver Mine.
 - Decoration of the royal rooms at Kalmar Castle.

Births

Deaths

 7 April - Gunilla Bese, defender of Vyborg Castle   (born 1475) 
 - Conrad von Pyhy, Lord High Chancellor of Sweden 
 - Barbro Eriksdotter (Bielke), landowner, role model of the infamous pintorpafrun

References

 
Years of the 16th century in Sweden
Sweden